Christmas Caper is an ABC Family Original Movie. It aired on November 25, 2007 on ABC Family as part of their 25 Days of Christmas. The film stars Shannen Doherty, Ty Olsson, Sonya Salomaa and Stefanie von Pfetten.

Plot
A Grinch-like thief retreats to her hometown in Connecticut after a con goes bad and gets stuck baby-sitting her niece and nephew until their parents can make it home for Christmas. She spends most of her time devising ways to even the score with Clive, her partner in crime, until the spirit of the holidays can help put her priorities back on track.

Cast

 Shannen Doherty as Cate Dove
 Ty Olsson as Sheriff Hank Harrison
 Conrad Coates as Clive Henry
 Stefanie von Pfetten as Holly Barnes
 Sonya Salomaa as Savannah Cooper
 David Lewis as Brian Cooper
 Michael P. Northey as Duffy Abramowitz
 Josh Hayden as Parker Cooper
 Natasha Calis as Annie Cooper
 Donna White as Mrs. Bradley
 Jano Frandsen as Hamish Thurgood
 Jase-Anthony Griffith as Deputy Gary
 Val Cole as News Anchor
 Dax Belanger as Thurgood Guard
 Dee Jay Jackson as Cabbie
 Christina Jastrzembska as Verda
 Tara Wilson as Café Waitress
 Deni DeLory as Bug Buy Female Shopper
 Igor Morozov as Russian Fence
 Dalias Blake as Happy Hotel Guy
 Reg Tupper as Principal Grimes
 Lossen Chambers as Gossipy Neighbor
 Iris Paluly as Second Neighbor
 Tyronne L'Hirondelle as Jolly Guy
 Rob deLeeuw as Tourist
 Jason McKinnon as Thurgood Monitor Guy
 Troy Adamson as Mall Bench Guy (uncredited)

DVD
Christmas Caper was released on DVD on October 28, 2008.

Filming locations
Christmas Caper was filmed in Vancouver, British Columbia, Canada.

See also 
 List of Christmas films

References

External links
 Variety article
 
 ABC Family's 25 Days of Christmas Page

ABC Family original films
2007 television films
2007 films
American Christmas films
Films set in Connecticut
2000s English-language films
Christmas television films
Films directed by David Winkler